Francis William Lauderdale Adams (27 September 1862 – 4 September 1893) was an essayist, poet, dramatist, novelist and journalist who produced a large volume of work in his short life.

Early years
Adams was born in Malta the son of Andrew Leith Adams F. R. S., F. G. S., an army surgeon, who later became well known as a scientist, a fellow of the Royal Society, and an author of natural history books set in different parts of the British Empire. Francis's mother, Bertha Jane Grundy, became a well-known novelist. After his education at Shrewsbury School he served from 1879 as an attaché in Paris, and then took up a teaching position as an assistant master at Ventnor on the Isle of Wight for two years.

Adams joined the Social Democratic Federation, the first avowedly Marxist political party in the UK, in London in 1883.

Australia
In 1884 he married Helen Uttley and migrated to Australia, where he started work as a tutor on a station at Jerilderie, New South Wales, but soon moved on to Sydney and then Queensland, dedicating himself to writing.

In 1884 Adams had a volume of poems published, and also Henry and Other Tales (London) and an autobiographical novel Leicester, an Autobiography (1884). These were followed in 1886 by a collection of Australian Essays on topics such as Melbourne, Sydney and the poet Adam Lindsay Gordon. This was published in Melbourne and in London. During the Australian period he also contributed to periodicals, including The Bulletin.

Adams then moved to Brisbane and published Poetical Works (1886, Brisbane), a quarto volume of over 150 pages printed in double columns. His wife died giving birth to a baby boy, Leith, who also died. Adams remained in Brisbane until the early part of 1887, and published a further novel, Madeline Brown's Murderer (1887, Sydney).  After a short stay in Sydney, Adams married again, returned to Brisbane, and remained there until about the end of 1889 writing leaders for the Brisbane Courier. At the end of 1887, Adams published his best-known collection of verse, Songs of the Army of the Night, which created a sensation in Sydney, and later went through three editions in London.

Later years
He returned to England in early 1890 and published two more novels: John Webb's End, a Story of Bush Life (1891, London), and The Melbournians (1892). A volume of short stories, Australian Life, followed in 1892.
 
Adams' health was failing rapidly from tuberculosis. He spent the winter of December 1892–February 1893 in Alexandria finishing a book attacking the British occupation of Egypt: The New Egypt was released after his death in 1893. His novel, A Child of the Age, a reworking of Leicester, an Autobiography, was brought out posthumously in 1894 by John Lane as the fourth book in its Keynote Series. It describes vividly the schooldays (at "Glastonbury") and poverty-stricken struggles of a would-be poet and scholar, Bertram Leicester, in a way understandably suffused with a fin-de-siècle melancholy. Other posthumous publications were Tiberius – a striking drama with an introduction by William Michael Rossetti, presenting a new view of the Emperor's character, and finally, Essays in Modernity in 1899.

Suicide
Adams shot himself dead at a boarding house in Margate, England, during a severe tubucular haemorrhage that would probably have been fatal in any case. He had long carried a pistol for this purpose. He was survived by his second wife, Edith (née Goldstone), who assisted his suicide but was not convicted of any crime. As a self-professed "child of his age", Adams combined in his life and work many distinctive features of fin de siècle British culture and Australian radical nationalism in the 1890s, including a strong sympathy with socialist and feminist movements.

Literature and politics
Adams's energy and drive can be seen in his large written output over a short lifetime. He often wrote quickly and did little revision, living as he did on income from writing. Songs of the Army of the Night has been reprinted in many editions, but the reputation of these poems derives from their engagement with social issues, rather than their poetic value. Adams displayed a deep sympathy with downtrodden races and men.

As an activist in the Social Democratic Federation the rhetoric of At the West India Docks where London dock labourers were working for fourpence an hour, resonated in the labour movement. Some of his verse provoked resentment in Conservative circles, but Adams was part of a rapidly growing political working class movement fired by poverty and exploitation in Britain.

As a writer of novels Adams connected with contemporary social issues. Although his work could be hasty and uneven, it is interesting for its treatment of themes such as the portrayal of women in Australia, of nationalism. For example, The Melbournians, is a society romance featuring a central female character and a democratically minded Australian journalist.

Adams had not intended to be a journalist, but once in Australia Adams took to the work quickly and was highly regarded by colleagues in Sydney and Brisbane.

Works
Henry and Other Tales (1884) 
Leicester: An Autobiography (1885)
Australian Essays (1886)
Madeline Brown's Murderer (1887)
Poetical Works (1887)
Songs of the Army of the Night (1888)
John Webb's End: Australian Bush Life (1891)
Australian Life (1892)
The Melbournians: A Novel (1892)
The Australians: A Social Sketch (London: T. Fisher Unwin, 1893)
A Child of the Age (1894)
Tiberius: A Drama (1894)
Essays in Modernity: Criticisms and Dialogues (1899)

See also

Rudra Mohammad Shahidullah
Sergei Yesenin

References

Sources 

Tasker, Meg. Francis Adams: a Research Guide.  University of Queensland, Victorian Fiction Research Guides, 1996.
Tasker, Meg. Struggle and Storm: The Life and Death of Francis Adams, Carlton, Melbourne: Melbourne University Press, 2001.

External links

1862 births
1893 deaths
19th-century Australian novelists
Australian male novelists
Australian poets
People educated at Shrewsbury School
Maltese emigrants to Australia
Suicides by firearm in England
19th-century Australian journalists
19th-century Australian male writers
Australian male poets
19th-century poets
19th-century male writers
19th-century Australian short story writers
1890s suicides
Australian male journalists